Orobanche elatior the knapweed broomrape is a species of flowering plant belonging to the family Orobanchaceae.

It is a parasitic plant that lives on knapweed. Its native range is Europe to China and Iran.

References

elatior